New Jersey is a state within the United States of America that lies on the north eastern edge of the North American continent. It shares a land border with the state of New York along the north, ratified by both states after the New York – New Jersey Line War, which is its only straight line border. New Jersey is slightly larger than the country of Kuwait.

The Atlantic Ocean is east of the state. It is separated from New York, in particular the boroughs of the Bronx and Manhattan in New York City by the Hudson River, and from Staten Island by the Kill van Kull and the Arthur Kill. Liberty Island is an exclave of State of New York in New Jersey waters in Upper New York Bay. Ellis Island, also in the Upper Bay, and Shooter's Island, in  Newark Bay, each have sections belonging to either of the two states.

On its west, New Jersey is flanked by the Delaware River that forms its border with the Commonwealth of Pennsylvania and Delaware Bay which separates New Jersey from the State of Delaware.  However, due to a fluke in a colonial land grant for the city of New Castle, Delaware (called The Twelve-Mile Circle), there is a small amount of Delaware territory in contiguous New Jersey. Finns Point, piers at Penns Grove, New Jersey and Pennsville, and Artificial Island, the tip of a small peninsula at Lower Alloways Creek are connected to Salem County. A coal pier in Logan Township also extends into the river. New Jersey's natural regions were formed by glaciers.

Area

New Jersey is ranked 47th of the fifty states that comprise the United States of America in terms of area. New Jersey spans 70 miles (110 km) at its widest, and 166 miles (267 km) in length.

However, while this offers the impression that New Jersey is entirely urban or suburban, it is not. Large swaths of northwestern and southern New Jersey are extremely rural.

Political and cultural geography

The State of New Jersey is divided into 21 counties, which contain a total of 566 municipalities.  As in most New England states, all land in New Jersey is incorporated. New Jersey municipalities have a strong tradition of independent home rule.

New Jersey is informally divided into the cultural regions of North Jersey, South Jersey, and sometimes Central Jersey.

New Jersey State Department of Tourism distinguishes six distinct tourist regions: the Gateway, Greater Atlantic City, the Southern Shore Region, the Delaware River Region, the Shore Region and the Skylands Region.

Climate

Features

Rivers 

New Jersey rivers includes streams formally designated as rivers.  There are also smaller streams (i.e., branches, creeks, drains, forks, licks, runs, etc.) in the state.  Major rivers include the Manasquan, Maurice, Mullica, Passaic, Rahway, Raritan, Musconetcong, and Delaware rivers.  Historically, the Delaware and Raritan rivers have provided transportation of goods and people inland from the Atlantic Ocean, and were once connected by the Delaware and Raritan Canal.  Today, these rivers, and the streams that feed them, provide sport and recreation for many people.

Barrier islands 

A series of barrier islands run the length of the Jersey Shore. They include Long Beach Island and Absecon Island. Many are popular tourist destinations.

Geology

Around 250 million years ago, during the Paleozoic and Mesozoic eras, the area that is today New Jersey bordered northern Africa as part of the supercontinent of Pangea. The pressure of the collision between North America and Africa gave rise to the Appalachian Mountains. Around 200 million years ago, Pangea began to break apart, separating the North American continent from the African continent. Around 18,000 years ago, the most recent ice age resulted in glaciers that reached New Jersey. As the glaciers retreated, they left behind Lake Passaic, as well as many rivers, swamps, and gorges.

Physiographic Provinces

New Jersey is a region with a high variety of geographical features in a small area.  The area can be broken into five regions, corresponding roughly to geological zones.  These regions from north to south are the Appalachian Valley and Ridge, Highlands, Newark Basin Piedmont, Inner Coastal Plain, and the Outer Coastal Plain.

Appalachian Valley and Ridge Physiographic Province

The Appalachian Valley and Ridge lies in the northwestern corner of the state and includes the Kittatinny Mountains, several smaller valleys and the popular Delaware Water Gap. Most of the state's section of the Appalachian Trail runs through this area. The province is bounded on the southeast by an unconformity between Cambrian and Precambrian formations.

Highlands Physiographic Province

The Highlands Physiographic Province is a geological formation composed primarily of Precambrian igneous and metamorphic rock running from the Delaware River near Musconetcong Mountain, northeast through the Skylands Region of New Jersey along the Bearfort Ridge and the Ramapo Mountains. Numerous abandoned mines dot the region, dating from the 18th and 19th centuries when iron, copper, zinc and other minerals were extracted from the formations.  The glaciated northern half of the province has an abundance of lakes and reservoirs which serve as water supplies for the urban areas to the east.  The region's watershed is protected by the Highlands Water Protection and Planning Act.

Newark Basin Piedmont

The Newark Basin is a region in northern New Jersey defined by the boundaries of a sediment-filled rift basin. This basin was formed when the supercontinent Pangaea began to split approximately 220 million years ago, causing several large depressions to form due to extension, which then filled with sediment. The basin itself extends from Rockland County in the southern tip of New York to south-eastern Pennsylvania. It lies within the broader region known as the Piedmont, a crescent-shaped area characterized by smooth topography and large volumes of sediments. Like the Piedmont, the Newark Basin has gentle topography consisting of red bed clastic sediments with occasional igneous rock formations, such as the Palisades Sill and the Watchung basalt flows; these igneous features are responsible for the dramatic elevation changes observed in the region, such as The Palisades and the Watchung Mountains, respectively. The boundaries of the Newark Basin, as well as major highways, are shown on the map at left......

For the geological history of the region, see Newark Basin.

Inner Coastal Plain
The Inner Coastal Plain province consists of lowlands and rolling hills underlain by Cretaceous deposits.  Surficial geology in this region contains a number of fossils.  The Monmouth County Park system, for example, includes a number of creeks where students and enthusiasts can gain real field exposure to cretaceous geology and paleontology.  (Always check with the park service staff regarding permissibility before entering any field site.)  The region's northwest border lies along the Piedmont Fall Line. Fertile, loamy soil makes the land ideal for agriculture and is responsible for New Jersey's nickname of the "Garden State".  Its deposits of Greensand marl containing potash were used since colonial days by farmers to fertilize their fields.

Outer Coastal Plain
The outer coastal plain consists of unconsolidated Tertiary deposits of sands, silt, and gravels.  The soils are sandy with less clay than the inner coastal plain, and are more acidic and dry.  The lack of fertility makes much of the region unsuitable for agriculture and large areas remain undeveloped.  The sandy Pine Barrens, an area that is agriculturally poor but species rich, occupy the center of the province.  Blueberries and cranberries have been cultivated in lowland bogs that have accumulated depths of organic matter.

Along the coast, sandy beaches attract a recreation industry, and the offshore barrier islands are popular vacation destinations.

Natural environment
New Jersey's natural environment preserves a range of habitats ranging from the Atlantic shore to the Appalachian Mountains. The sandy uplands of South Jersey are home to the Atlantic coastal pine barrens. Surrounding the Pine Barrens, along the coast and covering the Inner Coastal Plain and Piedmont, are the Northeastern coastal forests. The Highlands consist of Appalachian-Blue Ridge forests which grade into Allegheny Highlands forests in the far northeast.

See also

 New York–New Jersey Harbor Estuary
 Geography of the United States
 History of New Jersey

References

Citations

Books and background references

External links
 State of New Jersey